Hil (also, Gil’) is a village and the most populous municipality, except for the capital Qusar, in the Qusar Rayon of Azerbaijan.  It has a population of 5,022. The village is mostly inhabited by Lezgins.

References 

1970 ethnic composition of the Qusar Rayon(Russian): http://www.ethno-kavkaz.narod.ru/kusary70.html
Populated places in Qusar District